Centrocoris spiniger is a species of family Coreidae, subfamily Coreinae.

Distribution
This species can be found in most of Europe. The distribution area of these bugs also covers the Middle East and Central Asia.

Description

These bugs are light brown colored. The rostrum extends to the posterior end of the body. The pronotum is slightly arched on the sides, with prominent teeth at the posterior margin.

This species is rather similar to Centrocoris variegatus. A distinctive character of Centrocoris spiniger in respect of Centrocoris variegatus are longer antennae.

Biology
These bugs are often found on Asteraceae, especially thistles, as well as on grasses (Poaceae) and on (Chenopodiaceae).

References

External links 
 Biolib
 EOL

Coreini
Hemiptera of Europe